Gregory Tonde Kaziboni (born 10 February 1993) is a Zimbabwean footballer who plays for  side St Ives Town, where he plays as a midfielder.

Playing career

Northampton Town
Kaziboni was signed by Northampton Town while playing for local amateur side Obelisk United.

Greg was given a squad number in January 2011 and made his Football League debut against Gillingham the same month.

On 28 February 2012, Kaziboni was released from his contract at Northampton Town by manager Aidy Boothroyd.

Corby Town
Greg joined Conference North side Corby Town on 16 August 2012. joining a team with a number of links to his previous club, as on the same day former colleagues Nathaniel Wedderburn, Liam Richardson and Tom McGowan all signed, although former Northampton Town defender Andy Holt was forced to retire with a knee injury.

Kaziboni went onto make 28 appearances, and scored three goals in what was an extremely disappointing end to the 2012–13 season, as Corby Town finished the season relegated by a single goal, with Histon the fortunate beneficiaries.

Brackley Town
Greg signed for Brackley Town for the 2013–14 season in 2013, but only made five appearances and scored one goal.

Rugby Town
In November 2013, Kaziboni signed for Rugby Town, and he made his debut in the club's 3-1 win over Uxbridge.

Greg had a mixed season with Rugby Town netting two goals and left at the end of the season to re-join Brackley Town.

Brackley Town
Greg re-signed for Conference North side Brackley Town in 2014.

Kaziboni remained with Brackley Town for two seasons, and began the 2017–18 season with the club prior to departing, in total Greg made 46 appearances and scored five goals in the Conference North.

Biggleswade Town
Kaziboni joined Southern League Premier Division side Biggleswade Town near the beginning of the 2017–18 season, helping the club to secure a 16th place finish in the division.

Banbury United
In the summer of 2018, Greg signed for Southern League Premier Central side Banbury United on a one-year contract.

Kaziboni made his Southern League Premier Central debut for Banbury United on 11 August 2018, the opening day of the season. The club drew 1-1 in an away fixture with Rushall Olympic.

It was confirmed on 24 May 2019 that Kaziboni would leave Banbury United on the expiry of his contract. During his time with the club Kaziboni made 36 appearances and scored 9 goals in the Southern League Premier Central, as well as 3 appearances and 1 goal in the FA Cup, 3 appearances and 2 goals in the FA Trophy as well as an appearance and a goal in the final of the Oxfordshire Senior Cup, which Banbury United lost 4-3 to Oxford City.

Tamworth
On 2 June 2019, Kaziboni signed a one-year contract with Southern League Premier Central side Tamworth.

Following an injury lay off from pre-season, he made his debut on 31 August 2019, in an away fixture against Hitchin Town, scoring a brace in a 3-0 victory for the away side. Kaziboni added a third goal to his tally for the club on 14 September 2019, in his third match, a 3-0 victory against Redditch United.

AFC Rushden & Diamonds (loan)
On 30 December 2019, it was announced that Kaziboni had joined Southern League Premier Division Central rivals AFC Rushden & Diamonds on a months loan, in a bid to get some regular first team football.

Greg made his debut for AFC Rushden & Diamonds on 1 January 2020 in a Southern League Premier Division Central away fixture with St Ives Town, helping his new club to a 4-3 victory.

Kaziboni scored his first goal in an AFC Rushden & Diamonds shirt on 11 January 2020, scoring the equaliser in a Southern League Premier Division Central 3-2 away victory against Leiston.

Banbury United (loan)
On 31 January 2020, Kaziboni rejoined Southern League Premier Division Central side Banbury United on a months loan.

Greg made his second debut for the club the following day, as his new side lost narrowly 1-0 at home to Bromsgrove Sporting.

Stratford Town
Greg signed for Southern League Premier Division Central side Stratford Town on 21 June 2020.

Nuneaton Borough
On 30 May 2022, Kaziboni, along with Chris Clements and Anthony Dwyer were released by Nuneaton Borough following the conclusion of the 2021–22 season.

St Ives Town
On 24 July 2022, Kaziboni along with compatriot Wilson Chingoka, and Jordan Williams were all confirmed as signing for Southern League Premier Division Central side St Ives Town.

Career statistics

Club

Honours

Club

Brackley Town
Northamptonshire Senior Cup: 2014–15

References

External links

1993 births
Living people
Zimbabwean footballers
Association football midfielders
English Football League players
Southern Football League players
Northampton Town F.C. players
Corby Town F.C. players
Brackley Town F.C. players
Rugby Town F.C. players
Biggleswade Town F.C. players
Banbury United F.C. players
Tamworth F.C. players
AFC Rushden & Diamonds players
Stratford Town F.C. players
Nuneaton Borough F.C. players
St Ives Town F.C. players